Penny Ladell Willrich is an American lawyer, academic administrator, and judge who served as the interim dean of the Arizona Summit Law School from 2017 to 2018. In 1999, she became the first Black woman to serve as a judge on the Arizona Superior Court.

Life 
Willrich is from Grand Prairie, Texas. She is the daughter of civil rights advocates. Her father was a preacher. Willrich volunteered for local political campaigns during her youth and intended to become a teacher. Influenced by her activism, she decided to study law. Willrich earned a B.A. (1974) and M.A. (1977) in political science, B.A. (1976) in history, and a teaching certificate at the University of Texas at Arlington.  She was its first Black student body president. Willrich attended Texas Tech University School of Law from 1977 to 1979 before transferring to Antioch School of Law where she completed a J.D. in 1982. 

From 1982 to 1987, Willrich worked for West Texas Community Legal Services in Fort Worth and practiced family law including divorce, custody, consumer action, and landlord and tenant disputes. In June 1987, she became the managing attorney and director of domestic violence of Community Legal Services in Phoenix, Arizona. From 1992 to 1994, Willrich was the assistant director of the administration of children, youth, and families division in the Arizona Department of Economic Security. She supported legislation for technological improvements which provided computers to child protective services social workers. From 1994 to 1995, she worked in private practice.

For five years, Willrich was a volunteer pro tem judge before serving as a commissioner. From 1995 to 1999, she was a commissioner in the juvenile and criminal division of the Arizona Superior Court in Maricopa County. In this role, she was appointed by the Arizona Supreme Court to develop the draft of the re-drafted juvenile court rules. Willrich served as a trial court judge in the juvenile, criminal, and family division from 1999 to 2005. She was the first Black woman judge on the Arizona Superior Court.

Willrich was an associate professor of law at the Phoenix School of Law. In April 2007, she was awarded the Maricopa County NAACP Roy Wilkins Award for service. In 2008, Willrich was elected to the board of Community Legal Services as its vice president. Later that same year, she completed a Ph.D., summa cum laude, in criminal justice, criminology, and public safety at Capella University and was inducted into Alpha Phi Sigma. On July 1, 2011, she was appointed as its associate dean of academic affairs, succeeding Shandrea Solomon. On January 1, 2017, Willrich became the interim dean of the Arizona Summit Law School, succeeding Shirley Mays.

See also
 List of African-American jurists

References 

Living people
Year of birth missing (living people)
People from Grand Prairie, Texas
21st-century American women judges
21st-century American judges
20th-century American women judges
20th-century American judges
Arizona state court judges
20th-century American women lawyers
21st-century American women lawyers
20th-century African-American women
21st-century African-American women
University of Texas at Arlington alumni
David A. Clarke School of Law alumni
Capella University alumni
Deans of law schools in the United States
African-American academic administrators
African-American women academic administrators
Women heads of universities and colleges
African-American women lawyers
African-American judges
Superior court judges in the United States